Neva Surrenda is the third studio album by hip hop group Outlawz. It was released on October 22, 2002 on Outlaw Recordz.

Track listing

Charts

References

2002 albums
Outlawz albums
Albums produced by Mike Dean (record producer)
Rap-A-Lot Records albums
Outlaw Recordz albums
Gangsta rap albums by American artists